The women's marathon event at the 1995 Pan American Games was held in Mar del Plata on 25 March.

Results

References

Athletics at the 1995 Pan American Games
1995
Pan
Panamerican
1995 Panamerican
1995 Panamerican Games